Samuel T. and Mary B. Parnell House, also known as Mt. Branson Lodge, is a historic home located near Branson, Taney County, Missouri.  It was built about 1912 and is a two-story, American Craftsman-style dwelling constructed of irregular rubble courses of native stone. The façade features a partial-width, two-story porch supported by massive, battered stone piers. Also located on the property is a contributing one-story, rock and wood-frame garage.

The home was listed on the National Register of Historic Places in 2008.

References

Houses on the National Register of Historic Places in Missouri
Bungalow architecture in Missouri
Houses completed in 1912
Buildings and structures in Taney County, Missouri
National Register of Historic Places in Taney County, Missouri